The Gray Wolves is a 1993 Russian political film directed by Igor Gostev.

Plot 
In the center of the plot is the displacement of Nikita Khrushchev, against which the story of a man who tried to uncover a plot against him is told.

Cast 
 Rolan Bykov as Nikita Khrushchev
 Aleksandr Belyavsky as Leonid Brezhnev
 Lev Durov as Anastas Mikoyan
 Bogdan Stupka as   Semichastny
 Aleksandr Mokhov as Sorokin
 Aleksandra Zakharova as Marina
 Aleksandr Potapov as Sergei Khrushchev
 Gennady Sayfulin as Malkov
 Vladimir Troshin as   Podgorny
 Yevgeny Zharikov as   Shelepin
 Viktor Sergachyov as Suslov
 Pyotr Velyaminov as Nikolai Ignatov

References

External links 
 

1993 films
1990s Russian-language films
Russian historical action films
Russian biographical films
Russian detective films
Mosfilm films
1990s political films
Films set in 1960
Action films based on actual events
Films shot in Moscow
Cultural depictions of Leonid Brezhnev
Cultural depictions of Nikita Khrushchev